The following table shows the aspect ratio (height to width ratio) of national flags used by countries and dependencies. Variant flags such as ensigns are listed in the "Alternative flags" column if they have different proportions from the national flag. Territories without an official flag distinct from that of their controlling country are excluded.

The ratios most commonly used are 2:3, used by 85 of 195 sovereign states, followed by 1:2, used by 54 sovereign states. Most dependencies and former colonies use the same proportions as their mother countries: all British Overseas Territories use 1:2 ratios, while the flags of most former and current Dutch and French areas have 2:3 proportions.

For comparison, the ratios are also given as a decimal number, which is the flag width divided by its height (e.g. a 2:3 flag has a decimal ratio of  = 1.5). Flags with irrational ratios have only a decimal approximation, and have the exact form given in the "Notes" column (which also includes additional information such as similar flags, recent flag changes, etc.).

Legend:

 Bold: Sovereign states (UN member states and UN General Assembly non-member observer states)
 Bold italics: States with limited recognition
 Italics: Dependencies, constituent countries, and other non-sovereign territories

Click on the "Flag" header to sort by status: first sovereign states, then de facto countries, then dependencies.

Main list

 None of the thirteen overseas regions and territories of France except French Polynesia, New Caledonia and the French Southern and Antarctic Lands have official flags other than the French tricolor. A flag for the department of French Guiana has been officially adopted, though this flag has not been approved by the regional council. Most of the other territories however have unofficial flags, and some of these flags are used locally. See Flags of the regions of France.
 Akrotiri and Dhekelia, Sovereign Base Areas of the United Kingdom, don't have an official flag other than the Union Jack. A reported green flag defaced with two golden lions is actually the flag of the Dhekelia Garrison, and is not an official flag of the entire territory.
 The British Overseas Territory of Saint Helena, Ascension and Tristan da Cunha has no separate flag and uses the Union Jack. The three constituent parts have their own flags, which all follow the "blue ensign with territorial arms" pattern of most other BOTs. See Flag of Saint Helena, Flag of Ascension Island and Flag of Tristan da Cunha.
 The nine United States Minor Outlying Islands don't have official flags, though there are unofficial local flags for five of the islands and island groups (Johnston Atoll, the Midway Islands, Palmyra Atoll, Wake Island and Navassa Island).
 None of the Norwegian overseas territories have flags.
 Antarctica has no government and as such cannot officially adopt a flag, though there are a few proposed flags used to represent the continent.

Notes

References

 Proportions